Juan O'Gorman (July 6, 1905 – January 17, 1982) was a Mexican painter and architect.

Early life and family
Juan O'Gorman was born on 6 July 1905 in Coyoacán, then a village to the south of Mexico City and now a borough of the Federal District, to an Irish immigrant father, Cecil and Encarnación O'Gorman (née O'Gorman). His parents were distant cousins. He had three younger siblings, Edmundo, Margarita and Tomás. Despite his father's influence, O'Gorman chose to focus on architecture early in his career. In 1927, he graduated from Academy of San Carlos, the Art and Architecture school at the National Autonomous University.

His first marriage was to Nina Wright, Russian-American architect. He later married Helen Fowler, an American artist with whom he had an adopted daughter.

Career

San Ángel houses 
In 1929, O'Gorman purchased a plot containing two tennis courts in Mexico City's San Ángel colonia. On the plot, O'Gorman constructed a small house and studio intended for use by his father, now known as the Cecil O'Gorman House. The building's forms were strongly influenced by the work of Le Corbusier, whose theories of architecture O'Gorman studied. O'Gorman dubbed the house the first functionalist structure in Latin America.

Diego Rivera, a contemporary of O'Gorman, impressed with the design of the Cecil O'Gorman House, commissioned the architect to design a home for him and Frida Kahlo on an adjacent plot. The house was built in a similar functionalist style from 1931 to 1932. The Rivera-Kahlo house was two houses connected by a bridge. Both houses were purchased to be restored and opened to the public with the Rivera-Kahlo house operating as a museum.

Schools 
In 1932, Narciso Bassols, then Secretary of Education, appointed O'Gorman to the position of Head of Architectural Office of the Ministry of Public Education, where he went on to design and build 26 elementary schools in Mexico City. The schools were built with the philosophy of "eliminating all architectural style and executing constructions technically."

After 6 years of functionalist projects, O'Gorman turned away from strict functionalism later in life and worked to develop an organic architecture, combining the influence of Frank Lloyd Wright with traditional Mexican constructions.

Central Library at Ciudad Universitaria (UNAM)

Juan O'Gorman's most celebrated work due to its creativity, construction technique, and dimensions, are the four thousand square meters murals covering the four faces of the building of the Central Library at Ciudad Universitaria at UNAM. These murals are mosaics made from millions of colored stones that he gathered all around Mexico in order to be able to obtain the different colors he needed. The north side pictures Mexico's pre-Hispanic past and the south facade its colonial one, while the east wall depicts the contemporary world, and the west shows the university and contemporary Mexico.

"From the beginning, I had the idea of making mosaics of colored stones in the walls of the collections, with a technique in which I was already well experienced. With these mosaics the library would be different from the other buildings of Ciudad Universitaria, and it would be given a particular Mexican character."

Later work 
O'Gorman built and designed his own house in the suburb of Pedregal, which was part built structure part natural cave, which is known as "The Cave House" from 1953 to 1956. It was decorated with mosaics throughout. It was demolished in 1969.

His paintings often treated Mexican history, landscape, and legends. A mural commission in Pátzcuaro, Michoacan resulted in the huge "La historia de Michoacán" in the Biblioteca Pública Gertrudis Bocanegra in a former church. He painted the murals in the Independence Room in Mexico City's Chapultepec Castle, and the huge murals of his own 1952 Central Library of the National Autonomous University of Mexico, designed with Gustavo Saavedra and Juan Martínez de Velasco.

In 1959, together with fellow artists, Raúl Anguiano, Jesús Guerrero Galván, and Carlos Orozco Romero, O'Gorman founded the militant Unión de Pintores y Grabadores de México (Mexican Painters and Engravers Union).

Death 

He died on 17 January 1982, as a result of suicide. Authorities believe the artist grew despondent after being diagnosed with a heart ailment which curtailed his work. O'Gorman was found dead at his home.

Awards 
National Prize for Arts and Sciences of "fine arts", 1972.

Bibliography

See also
Mexican Muralism
Modernist architecture in Mexico

Further reading

References

External links
 Juan O'Gorman on artcyclopedia.com

Mexican muralists
Modernist architects from Mexico
Modern painters
Functionalist architects
International style architects
1905 births
1982 deaths
Artists from Mexico City
Suicides in Mexico
Architects from Mexico City
Architecture firms of Mexico
National Autonomous University of Mexico alumni
Artists who committed suicide
Mexican people of Irish descent
20th-century Mexican architects
20th-century Mexican painters
Mexican male painters
1982 suicides
20th-century Mexican male artists